Football Club Nassaji Mazandaran (Bâšgâh-e Futbâl-e Nassaji Mazandaran) is an Iranian football club based in Qa'em Shahr, Mazandaran. They currently compete in the Persian Gulf Pro League.

Nassaji has one of the highest average attendances in Iran. Nassaji is also the oldest club from the Caspian region of Iran and one of the oldest in all of Iran. Nassaji was promoted to the Persian Gulf Pro League for the first time in 2018, making them the second team from the province of Mazandaran to ever play in the league.

History

Establishment
Nassaji Mazandaran Company established the club in Qaem Shahr in 1959. Nassaji entered the Qods Cup in 1988 and soon after they entered the top division Azadegan League in 1991 and remained a strong competitor in that division until 1995.

Recent years
Nassaji stayed in 2nd division until 2001 and when Iranian Football Federation decided to start a professional league, the Azadegan league became the second highest league in Iran. In 2004 Nassaji was relegated to 2nd Division but they were promoted back to the Azadegan League at the end of the 2005–06 season. On 3 August 2006 Nasser Hejazi signed as head-coach of Nassaji on a one-year deal for the 2006–07 season.

In the 2013–14 season, Nassaji had their closest call with promotion to the Persian Gulf Pro League since their relegation from the top flight in 1995, the team finished third in Group A which was one place out of a promotion play-off spot. The following season Nassaji again finished third and was two points out of a promotion play-off spot.

Persian Gulf Pro League

On 29 April 2018, after a win against Rah Ahan, Nassaji finished in second place in the Azadegan League and were promoted to the Persian Gulf Pro League for the first time.

Facilities
Since the club was created, Nassaji has trained and played its home games at Vatani Stadium, which was built in the 1940s. After the Islamic Revolution of 1979, the stadium was expanded to hold 15,000 people.

Seasons

The table below chronicles the achievements of Nassaji Mazandaran since 1989.

Honours
  Azadegan League
Runners-up (1): 2017–18
  Hazfi Cup
Winners (1): 2021–22
 Iranian Super Cup
Runners-up (1):  2022

Players

First-team squad 
As of 10 August 2022

For recent transfers, see List of Iranian football transfers summer 2022.

Staff
Current coach staff

Head coaches

 Rahim Dastneshan (1983–1994)
 Fereydoon Asgarzadeh (1994–1995)
 Abolfazl Mozdastan (1994–1995)
 Rahim Dastneshan (1995–1996)
 Nader Dastneshan (1996–2002)
 Hossein Mesgar Saravi (2002–2004)
 Rahim Dastneshan (2004–2005)
 Ebrahim Talebi (2005–2006)
 Nasser Hejazi (2006– 2007)
 Morteza Sadeghi (2007)
 Hossein Ghazal Seflou (2007)
 Ebrahim Talebi (2007–2008)
 Morteza Sadeghi (2008)
 Hassan Khourdestan (2008)
 Morteza Sadeghi (2008–2009)
 Rahim Dastneshan (2009)
 Esmaeil Esmaeili (2009)
 Nader Dastneshan (2009–2010)
 Reza Foruzani (2010)
 Farhad Kouchakzadeh (2010)
 Yahya Golmohammadi (2010–2011)
 Esmaeil Esmaeili (2011–2013)
 Younes Geraeili (2013)
 Nader Dastneshan (2013–2015)
 Paulo Alves (2015)
 Kourosh Mousavi (2015–2016)
 Mahmoud Fekri (2016)
 Hossein Mesgar Saravi (2016–2017)
 Saket Elhami (2017)
 Hossein Mesgar Saravi (2017)
 Mehdi Pashazadeh (2017)
 Davoud Mahabadi (2017–2018)
 Javad Nekounam (2018)
 Majid Jalali (2019)
 Mohammad Reza Mohajeri (2019–2020)
 Mahmoud Fekri (2020)
 Vahid Fazeli (2020–2021)
 Majid Jalali (2021)
 Saket Elhami (2021–2022)
 Esmaeil Esmaeili (2022)
 Hamid Motahari (2022–Present)

Sponsorship
Shirt sponsors and manufacturers

Managers
Owners

 Kourosh Rahmani (2007–2009)
 Mehdi Parham (2009–2013)
 Hossein Ghasemnezhad (2013–2014)
 Mehdi Parham (2014–2017)
 Mehdi Parham,  Farhad Sanieifar (2017)
 Farhad Sanieifar (2017–2018)
 Farhad Sanieifar,  Reza Haddadian (2018–2019)
 Reza Haddadian (2019–Present)

Chairmans

 Kourosh Rahmani (2004–2007)
 Abed Mahzoun (2007)
 Kourosh Rahmani (2007–2009)
 Mohammad Ali Ghanbari (2009)
 Mehdi Parham (2009–2010)
 Mohammad Hassan Heydar Zadeh (2010)
 Saeed Azari (2010–2011)
 Mohammad Hassan Heydar Zadeh (2011)
 Yousef Daftari (2011)
 Mohammad Hassan Heydar Zadeh (2011)
 Ahmad Sahadatmand (2011–2013)
 Mohammad Hassan Heydar Zadeh (2013)
 Mohammad Ali Ghanbari (2013)
 Mohammadreza Ranjbar (2013)
 Mohammad Ali Ghanbari (2013–2014)
 Sadegh Dorudgar (2014–2015)
 Mohammad Hassan Heydar Zadeh (2015–2016)
 Hamed Ebrahimi (2016)
 Abdolhamid Ramezani (2016–2017)
 Ali Amiri (2017–2019)
 Mohammad Kazemi (2019–2019)
 Mohammad Ali Ghanbari (2019)
 Alireza Asadi (2019)
 Izad Seyfollahpour (2019–2020)
 Ali Amiri (2020–2021)
 Izad Seyfollahpour (2021–Present)

Supporters
Behdad Salimi (Olympic gold medallist)Hanif Omranzadeh (Footballer) Mohsen Bengar (Footballer) Shoja Khalilzadeh (Footballer)''

Documentary Movie

The acclaimed documentary "Hope Of Suffered City" is directed by Maryam Elhamian and Mostafa Haji Ghasemi in connection with the F.C. Nassaji team. This film made from the perspective of the fans of the F.C. Nassaji team and depicts their concerns and efforts. This documentary deals with the ascent of F.C. Nassaji team to the Premier League after 24 years. The film was screened at the Cinema Verite Film Festival at Tehran and was selected as one of the festival's most popular works.

See also
Persian Gulf Pro League

References

External links
Official site
Persian League
F.C. Nassaji Mazandaran
F.C. Nassaji Mazandaran

 
Football clubs in Iran
Association football clubs established in 1959
Sport in Mazandaran Province
1959 establishments in Iran
Football clubs in Qaem Shahr